What Exit is an album by violinist Mark Feldman with pianist John Taylor, bassist Anders Jormin, and drummer Tom Rainey recorded in 2005 and released on the ECM label

Reception

The Allmusic review awarded the album 4 stars stating "The compositions are Feldman originals, and are rife with nuanced traces of his eclectic stylistic approach, not to mention the artist's magnificent skill on the violin".

The Guardian's John Fordham observed "Contemporary jazz/classical violin might be a bit spiky for some, but the musicianship and the conversational skills are remarkable".

PopMatters reviewer Will Layman said "there’s a ton for modern jazz fans to enjoy here, and it is plain that Mark Feldman—having paid his dues a dozen times over—is deserving of the spotlight.  ECM has given him a superior opportunity here, with a sparkling but bold trio at his back.  The road ahead looks to paved with more good music".

JazzTimes's Mike Shanley commented "What Exit is sequenced to alternate ruminative pieces with more upbeat ones, with variations in structure marking each piece... Throughout, Feldman plays with a strong tone that never gets thin or shrill, even as he flies into the upper register of his instrument".

All About Jazz reviewer John Kelman said "What Exit is a stunning debut from a group that hopefully won't be just a one-time affair".

Billboard's Philip Booth said " it's an engaging, sometimes challenging mix of avant-jazz and new-classical styles".

The Penguin Jazz Guide reflected "What Exit was worth the wait. Feldman doesn't so much bathe in the wonderful sound Manfred Eicher and engineer James Farber lay out for him as rise to the challenge of it. Feldman's violin has become a compelling improvisational voice"

Track listing
All compositions by Mark Feldman
 "Arcade" - 22:52  
 "Father Demo Square" - 5:57  
 "Everafter" - 8:44  
 "Ink Pin" - 5:12  
 "Elegy" - 5:51  
 "Maria Nuñes" - 9:38  
 "Cadence" - 8:18  
 "What Exit" - 3:41

Personnel
Mark Feldman — violin
John Taylor — piano
Anders Jormin — bass
Tom Rainey — drums

References 

ECM Records albums
Mark Feldman albums
2006 albums
Albums produced by Manfred Eicher